Felice Di Cecco (born 27 June 1994) is an Italian footballer who plays as a midfielder. Di Cecco made his professional debut during .

Career

Youth career
Born in Fara San Martino, Abruzzo, Di Cecco started his career at Abruzzan club Pescara. He was released in 2011.

Brescia
After 2 years without a club, he was signed by Serie B club Brescia in 2013. However, he failed to play for the first team, as well as unable to play for their reserves team as overage player. Di Cecco only played three times for the reserves in training matches against the first team.

Cesena
However, in June 2014, few days before the closing of 2013–14 financial year, Di Cecco (for €1.6M) and Antonio Romano (for €2.4M) were sold to Cesena in a 3-year contract for a total of €4 million transfer fee, at the same time Brescia also signed Emanuele Fonte and Simone Galassi also for a total of €4 million fee. The deals made both club had a paper profit of €4 million, but generating a cost of amortization of €1.333 million in the next 3 seasons. Both clubs were boosted by the paper profits, which Brescia had a net assets of €2.75 million at 30 June 2014, as well as €4.55 million for Cesena (Cesena also had another swap deal with Parma, which bankrupted in the following summer).

Di Cecco failed to enter the first team either at Cesena, which the club was participating in 2014–15 Serie A. On 31 January 2015 Di Cecco and Luigi Palumbo were moved to Slovenian club ND Gorica in temporary deals. The bureaucratic process was completed on 5 February.

On 31 August 2015 Di Cecco and Abdoul Yabré were signed by Santarcangelo in another loan. He also played in next two matches of the Lega Pro Cup.

References

Italian footballers
Delfino Pescara 1936 players
Brescia Calcio players
A.C. Cesena players
ND Gorica players
Santarcangelo Calcio players
Serie C players
Italian expatriate footballers
Expatriate footballers in Slovenia
Italian expatriate sportspeople in Slovenia
Association football midfielders
Sportspeople from the Province of Chieti
Footballers from Abruzzo
1994 births
Living people